The Old Anchorage City Hall, also known as Historic City Hall, is located at 524 West Fourth Avenue in Anchorage, Alaska.  It is a two-story cast concrete building, designed by E. Ellsworth Sedille and built in 1936 with funding from the Public Works Administration.  It housed the city administration of the city until 1979, when most of the integrated city-borough administration was moved to the Hill Building at 632 West 6th Avenue.

The old city hall started the second generation of municipal architecture in the city, moving from frame construction to reinforced concrete.  The building was listed on the National Register of Historic Places in 1980.

The building now houses the sales staff for Visit Anchorage, formerly the Anchorage Convention & Visitors Bureau.

See also
National Register of Historic Places listings in Anchorage, Alaska

References

1936 establishments in Alaska
Government buildings completed in 1936
Buildings and structures in Anchorage, Alaska
City and town halls on the National Register of Historic Places in Alaska
Office buildings in Alaska
Buildings and structures on the National Register of Historic Places in Anchorage, Alaska
City halls in Alaska